The 10th Anniversary Acoustic World Tour is a current world tour by English singer-songwriter Patrick Wolf.

Background
The tour is launched to celebrate a decade in music. Wolf will take the stage playing grand piano, Celtic harp, dulcimer and more. He will be accompanied by one other musician on stage and has promised to play an entirely different set list on each night of the tour. The tour is planned to continue into 2013.

Support Acts
Woodpigeon
Mice Parade
Abi Wade
Rachel Sermanni

Setlist
Ghost Song
Hard Times
Teignmouth
Penzance
Overture
Paris
Together
Time Of My Life
The Libertine
London
The Sun Is Often Out
Bitten
Bermondsey Street
Wind In The Wires
House
The Magic Position

Encore
"Vulture"
"The City"
"Pigeon Song"
Source:

Tour dates

Other miscellaneous performances
This concert was short acoustic set and signing event.

References

2012 concert tours
2013 concert tours
Patrick Wolf concert tours